Niyati Roy-Shah (born 30 September 1965) is an Indian table tennis player. She competed at the 1988 Summer Olympics and the 1992 Summer Olympics.

References

External links
 

1965 births
Living people
Indian female table tennis players
Olympic table tennis players of India
Table tennis players at the 1988 Summer Olympics
Table tennis players at the 1992 Summer Olympics
Place of birth missing (living people)
Recipients of the Arjuna Award